Quitman County is a county located in the southwestern part of the U.S. state of Georgia. As of the 2020 census, the population was 2,235, making it the second-least populous county in Georgia. The county seat is Georgetown. The county was created on December 10, 1858, and named after General John A. Quitman, leader in the Mexican–American War, and once Governor of Mississippi. In November 2006, residents voted to consolidate the city government of Georgetown and the county government of Quitman into a consolidated city-county.

Geography
The entirety of Quitman County is located in the Middle Chattahoochee River–Walter F. George Lake sub-basin of the ACF River Basin (Apalachicola-Chattahoochee-Flint River Basin).

Major highways
  U.S. Route 82
  State Route 27
  State Route 39
  State Route 50

Adjacent counties
 Stewart County (north)
 Randolph County (east)
 Clay County (south)
 Barbour County, Alabama (west/CST Border)

National protected area
 Eufaula National Wildlife Refuge (part)

Demographics

2000 census
As of the census of 2000, there were 2,598 people, 1,047 households, and 755 families living in the county. The population density was 7/km2 (17/mi2). There were 1,773 housing units at an average density of 5/km2 (12/mi2). The racial makeup of the county was 52.12% White, 46.88% Black or African American, 0.23% Native American, 0.04% Asian, 0.19% from other races, and 0.54% from two or more races. 0.50% of the population were Hispanic or Latino of any race.

There were 1,047 households, out of which 26.00% had children under the age of 18 living with them, 50.20% were married couples living together, 18.70% had a female householder with no husband present, and 27.80% were non-families. Of all households, 24.90% were made up of individuals, and 12.30% had someone living alone who was 65 years of age or older. The average household size was 2.48 and the average family size was 2.95.

In the county, the population was spread out, with 24.00% under the age of 18, 7.20% from 18 to 24, 23.60% from 25 to 44, 25.40% from 45 to 64, and 19.90% who were 65 years of age or older. The median age was 42 years. For every 100 females there were 88.90 males. For every 100 females age 18 and over, there were 85.10 males.

The median income for a household in the county was $25,875, and the median income for a family was $30,691. Males had a median income of $23,365 versus $19,069 for females. The per capita income for the county was $14,301. About 16.10% of families and 21.90% of the population were below the poverty line, including 26.60% of those under age 18 and 24.50% of those age 65 or over.

2010 census
As of the 2010 United States Census, there were 2,513 people, 1,053 households, and 689 families living in the county. The racial makeup of the county was 51.3% white, 47.9% black or African American, 0.2% American Indian, 0.1% Asian, 0.1% from other races, and 0.4% from two or more races. Those of Hispanic or Latino origin made up 1.4% of the population. In terms of ancestry, 12.8% were Irish, 10.0% were English, 6.1% were German, and 5.5% were American.

Of the 1,053 households, 24.7% had children under the age of 18 living with them, 44.6% were married couples living together, 15.8% had a female householder with no husband present, 34.6% were non-families, and 30.6% of all households were made up of individuals. The average household size was 2.39 and the average family size was 2.98. The median age was 46.4 years.

The median income for a household in the county was $28,912 and the median income for a family was $34,342. Males had a median income of $27,096 versus $22,331 for females. The per capita income for the county was $13,642. About 21.2% of families and 31.6% of the population were below the poverty line, including 47.4% of those under age 18 and 24.5% of those age 65 or over.

2020 census

As of the 2020 United States Census, there were 2,235 people, 842 households, and 577 families residing in the county.

Education
Quitman County School District operates area public schools, including Quitman County High School.

County students attended Stewart-Quitman High School (now Stewart County High School) from 1978, until Quitman County High opened, in 2009.

Communities
 Georgetown (county seat)
 Morris

Politics

See also

 National Register of Historic Places listings in Quitman County, Georgia
List of counties in Georgia

References

External links
 Georgetown-Quitman County Consolidated Government
 Quitman County Sheriff

 
1858 establishments in Georgia (U.S. state)
Georgia (U.S. state) counties
Populated places established in 1858